Joshua Anthony Isaac Gowling (born 29 November 1983) is an English football manager and former professional footballer, who played as a defender and was most recently the manager of Hereford. 

Gowling began his career with West Bromwich Albion and saw action on the continent when he moved to Danish side Herfølge, where he also took in a loan spell with Ølstykke FC. He returned to England in 2005 and played professionally for AFC Bournemouth, Carlisle United, Hereford United, Gillingham, Lincoln City, Kidderminster Harriers and Grimsby Town. In 2017 he joined Torquay United and had a spell on loan with Alfreton Town before joining Hereford. He was appointed manager in January 2020.

Career

Early career

A central defender, Gowling began his career as a trainee at West Bromwich Albion aged just 14 under the guidance of Richard O'Kelly.

Following his release from Albion, he signed for Danish Premier Division club Herfølge Boldklub, making 17 appearances in 2003–04 and 13 appearances in 2004–05. He soon became disillusioned with life in Denmark, and returned to England.

AFC Bournemouth
He joined AFC Bournemouth on a trial basis to begin with in the 2005 close season, and signed a one-year contract after impressing in various pre-season friendlies. He began the 2005–06 season in good form before rupturing his knee ligaments after about a minute's play in the away match to Brentford – this serious injury ruled him out for the rest of the season. Having gradually returned to full fitness following his injury, Gowling featured in over 30 league games during the 2006–07 season, scoring his first professional goal in the process in a game against Rotherham United.

His performance in the 2–0 home win against Yeovil Town on 15 March 2008 saw him named in the League One Team of the Week. In 2007–08 he made 39 league appearances as Bournemouth were relegated to League Two.

Carlisle United
On 19 June 2008 Gowling, whose contract with Bournemouth had run out, signed for Carlisle United on a free transfer. He agreed a two-year contract with the club, who had lost in the League One play-offs the previous season, but spent most of that season on loan at Hereford, against whom he had made his league debut for Carlisle.

Gillingham
In July 2009 Gowling joined Gillingham on loan, initially for a month, and made his debut on 8 August in a 5–0 home win over Swindon Town. On 26 August 2009, Gowling transferred to Gillingham on a two-year contract, just two days after extending the loan deal for another month.

On 28 October 2010 he agreed to join Lincoln City on a month-long loan deal with the paperwork being completed the following day. He returned to Gillingham at the end of his loan deal.

In July 2011, he joined Crewe Alexandra on trial playing seventy minutes in the club's 4–0 friendly victory at Congleton Town on 11 July 2011 but was not offered a contract.

Lincoln City
On 14 July 2011, he agreed a two-year contract to return to Lincoln City. On 31 August 2012 he left Lincoln City by mutual consent

Kidderminster Harriers
On the same day he agreed a deal to sign for Kidderminster Harriers. Gowling became a key figure in the Harriers defence, ending the 2012–13 season in the Conference team of the year alongside teammates Lee Vaughan and Anthony Malbon, a season where Harriers finished 2nd, behind Mansfield Town. Gowling took the captain's armband for the 2014–15 season and also took a player/coach role within the club.

Grimsby Town
On 26 March 2015, Gowling joined Grimsby Town on loan till the end of the season. He scored on his debut for the Mariners on the 6 April 2015, from a corner he fired in Jack Mackreth's cross in the 69th minute, breaking the deadlock in the 0–2 victory over Alfreton Town, with a right footed shot 3 yards out from the centre of the box to the bottom right corner.

On 28 May 2015, Gowling signed a permanent two-year deal with the club. Gowling played in Grimsby's 3–1 victory over Forest Green Rovers in the 2016 National League play-off Final at Wembley, seeing Grimsby promoted to League Two after a six-year absence from the Football League. His efforts over the season earned him a place in the 2015–16 National League team of the year, alongside the league's outstanding players.

After making 21 appearances for Grimsby in the 2016–17 season he was released by the club on 9 May 2017.

Torquay United
He then signed for Torquay United on 13 June 2017. Gowling made 25 appearances for The Gulls as they were relegated from the National League. 

He was transfer-listed by Torquay at the end of the 2017–18 season.

Alfreton Town
On 13 August 2018, Gowling joined Alfreton Town on loan, making 10 league appearances in the National League North.

Hereford
Gowling signed for National League North club Hereford on 7 December 2018. 

On 21 January 2020, he was appointed as interim manager, following the departure of Russell Slade. Hereford encountered mixed form in Gowling's first months as interim manager, with the 2019-2020 National League North season eventually curtailed due to the COVID-19 pandemic.

In June 2020, he was given the job on a permanent basis, appointing Steve Burr as his assistant.

On 5 February 2023, Gowling left Hereford by mutual consent.

Career statistics

Managerial statistics

Honours

As a player
Grimsby Town
National League play-offs: 2016
FA Trophy runner-up: 2015–16

Individual
Conference Premier Team of the Year: 2012–13
National League Team of the Year: 2015–16

As a manager
Individual
National League North Manager of the Month: October 2022

References

External links

Josh Gowling player profile at carlisleunited.co.uk

1983 births
Living people
Footballers from Coventry
English footballers
Association football defenders
West Bromwich Albion F.C. players
Herfølge Boldklub players
Ølstykke FC players
AFC Bournemouth players
Carlisle United F.C. players
Hereford United F.C. players
Gillingham F.C. players
Lincoln City F.C. players
Kidderminster Harriers F.C. players
Grimsby Town F.C. players
Torquay United F.C. players
Alfreton Town F.C. players
Hereford F.C. players
English Football League players
National League (English football) players
English football managers
Hereford F.C. managers
National League (English football) managers